Charles Acton may refer to:
 Charles Acton (critic) (1914–1999), English-born Irish music critic
 Charles Januarius Acton (1803–1847), English cardinal
 Bud Acton or Charles Acton (born 1942), American retired basketball player
 Carlo Acton or Charles Acton (1829–1909), Italian composer

See also
Acton (surname)